Conner Bevans (born November 22, 1994) is an American soccer player.

Career
Bevans played four years of college soccer at Gonzaga University between 2012 and 2015, scoring 11 goals and tallying 8 assists in 72 appearances.

In 2014 while at college, Bevans appeared for USL PDL side Lane United FC. He also played in the PDL in 2016 after college, making 7 appearances for Kitsap Soccer Club.

Bevans signed with USL club Colorado Springs Switchbacks on March 11, 2017.

References

External links
Switchbacks bio

1994 births
Living people
American soccer players
Gonzaga Bulldogs men's soccer players
Lane United FC players
Kitsap Pumas players
Colorado Springs Switchbacks FC players
Association football forwards
Soccer players from California
USL League Two players
USL Championship players